The Dutch Fascist Union (in Dutch: Nederlandsche Fascisten Unie, abbreviated as NFU) was a short-lived Fascist organization in the Netherlands. NFU emerged on February 26, 1933, following a split from the General Dutch Fascist League (ANFB). Leading figures were Karel Eduard van Charante and Tony W. Hooykaas. 

NFU contested the 1933 parliamentary election. The group mustered 1771 votes. In The Hague the party got 0.19%, in Amsterdam 0.03%, in Haarlem 0.09%, in Utrecht 0.18% and in Zwolle 0.28%.

NFU published De Aanval.

Fascist parties in the Netherlands